MS Lofoten (call sign LIXN) is a Norwegian passenger and cargo vessel formerly owned and operated by Hurtigruten AS. The ship was built in 1964. After MS Nordstjernen was retired from coastal service in 2012, MS Lofoten became the oldest ship in the current fleet still in operation. It operates cruises around the coast of Norway and sometimes in the Svalbard archipelago. The vessel was declared worthy of preservation in 2001 by the Norwegian Director General of Historic Monuments to preserve Norway's cultural heritage. She has been refitted several times—in 1980, 1985, 1995 and most recently in 2004.

History

Many Norwegian coastal passenger and cargo ships were lost during the Second World War, which resulted in a need to rebuild the fleet. MS. Lofoten was the twelfth ship to be built during the reconstruction period after the war.

The ship was christened by Asbjørg Bergsmo on 7 September 1963 and was put into the Norwegian coastal route heading northbound from Bergen on 5 March 1964.

Ownership and port of registry of the ship has changed several times in its years of service. From 1964-1988 the ship was owned by Vesteraalens Dampskibsselskab (VDS). Its port of registry was Stokmarknes. In January 1988 Vesteraalens Dampskibsselskab (OVDS) and Ofotens Dampskibsselskab (ODS) was merged and it created Ofotens og Vesteraalens Dampskibsselskab and port of registry was Narvik. On 30 September 1988 the ship was sold to Finnmark Fylkesrederi og Ruteselskap (FFR) for 20 million Norwegian Kroner (nok), and its port of registry was changed to Hammerfest, Norway. In 1996 the ship was sold back to Ofotens and Vesteraalens Dampskibsselskab (OVDS) and the port of registry was changed back to Narvik.

Between 1968 and 1982, MS Lofoten also travelled an express route to Svalbard. It made another trip to the archipelago in the summer of 2007.

On 30 May 2001, the ship was declared worthy of preservation, and on 2 February 2002, she was taken out of the coastal traffic, but was reinserted in December the same year as a replacement for MS Nordnorge which sailed on a cruise in Antarctica.

From 19 October to 5 November 1980, MS Lofoten was upgraded and modernized at Aalborg Værft in Denmark. The second dining room was replaced by four large cabins on the Saloon deck (cabins A2 400, 402, 404, and 406). At this time the ship transitioned from classes to no-classes. The main engine was also overhauled during the upgrade.

The ship was again upgraded in October 1985 at Aalborg Værft in Denmark.

2014 marked Lofoten’s 50th anniversary and was celebrated on-board throughout the year. The same year the port of registry was changed to Tromsø. By its 50th birthday, the ship has travelled almost 3 million nautical miles, transported 1.25 million guests, and docked over 75,000 times in Hurtigruten ports.

It spent February 2015 in dry dock for maintenance and restoration. Starting in April 2015 the ship began a traditional service similar to the service style on-board during the 1960s which includes 60s-inspired menus and retro-style uniforms.

Construction

The ship is built in steel, except for the superstructure on the bridge deck, which is made of aluminium. It has a gross tonnage of 2621, two cold rooms, and total volume of cargo is 708 cubic meters.

The main engine is a 7-cylinder two-stroke Burmeister & Wain DM742 VT2 BF90 diesel engine. Originally the ship had three generators; as of 2015 two of the generators are original. In 2003, a fourth generator that acts as an emergency generator was installed.

A point of distinction of MS Lofoten is its old-fashioned style and construction. For example, unlike the other active ships in the Hurtigruten fleet, which use direct entry loading/offloading, MS Lofoten must load and unload cargo through a hatch on deck with the assistance of an on-board crane. Another period-specific difference is shared bathrooms (as opposed to in-room bathrooms). Some cabins have since been upgraded and bathrooms have been added.

Amenities

MS Lofoten has a total of 90 cabins (currently 88), spread over 5 decks

Deck C (lower deck): has 22 D-category cabins between 5 and 7m²: 12 outside cabins (6 on port and 6 on starboard), and 10 inside cabins with between 2 - 4 beds and a sink (a washroom/shower is found on the floor);

Deck B (steerage): has 23 D-category cabins: 13 outside cabins (5 to port, 8 to starboard) and 10 inside cabins with 2 - 4 beds and a sink (WC / shower on the floor). Deck B also has 20 outside Category A cabins - 6-8m²: (12 to port, 8 to starboard). These rooms also have a bathroom with toilet and shower. Additionally, there are 7 inside cabins of Category I - 6-10m² with a bathroom with toilet and shower.

Deck A: Contains 6 cabins of Category D (5-7m²), (5 outside cabins (2 to port 3 on the starboard side) and 1 inside cabin), 2 Category J cabins - 7-13m² (1 each port and starboard) - with a bathroom, and 1 Outside Stateroom (starboard) of category N - 7-13m², with bathroom. Deck A also has the front desk/reception.

Saloon deck: has 4 cabins (starboard) of Category A - 6-8m², with a bathroom. The Saloon deck also features several public spaces, including: Lounge (under the panoramic lounge), Sun deck (aft), Restaurant (midships)	

Boat deck: has 2 outside cabins (each 1 to port and starboard) of category N - 7-13m², bathroom. The Boat Deck also has Panorama Lounge (directly under the bridge) and Sun deck (aft).

Records

At 14:59 on Saturday July 18, 2015, MS Lofoten had been at sea for 300,000 hours. The original main engine had been in operation for 34.2 years and has operated the ship for over 4 million nautical miles. The ship has crossed the Arctic Circle 3000 times; 1500 northbound and 1500 southbound.

Incidents

MS Lofoten has had some minor accidents. Some of these include:

A collision with MS Storhaug on April 4, 1966.
The hull was damaged on February 17, 1968 Rørvik, Norway.
July 29, 1972, the ship hit a sandbank just outside Longyearbyen, Svalbard.
April 1977 Lofoten made a special trip to Shetland Islands. 
July 19, 1977, due in Tjeldsund, large hull damage. Getting repairs done in Harstad. It was sent to a shipyard in Oslo for additional repairs. It was returned to coastal service in August 1977.
The ship had another collision this time with MS Nordnorge on January 26, 1979.
May 21, 1982 there was hull damage in Kristiansund
October 21, 1983 Lofoten lost its anchor and chain.
March 6, 2006 Lofoten suffered some bridge damage
October 2010, the ship's crane requires a complete overhaul. Lofoten continued to sail without a crane until fixed.

References

External links 

 
 Hurtigruten-Web.com
 MS Lofoten Videos
 
 

Passenger ships of Norway
1963 ships
Hurtigruten
Ships built in Oslo
Merchant ships of Norway